"Puberty Song" is a song by Australian alternative rock group, The Mavis's. The song was released in December 1998 as the fourth and final single from their second studio album, Pink Pills (1998). The single peaked at number 92 on the ARIA Charts 

At the ARIA Music Awards of 1999, the song earned Kalju Tonuma a nomination for Engineer of the Year.

Track listing

Charts

References 
 

 

1998 songs 
1998 singles 
Mushroom Records singles